Lynn Lake is a natural lake in Day County, South Dakota, in the United States.

Lynn Lake takes its name from Lynn Township.

See also
List of lakes in South Dakota

References

Lakes of South Dakota
Lakes of Day County, South Dakota